Elkton station is a former passenger rail station located in Elkton, Maryland. The last passenger service to the station was Amtrak's Chesapeake from 1978 to 1983. The brick station building still remains along the Northeast Corridor tracks.

History

Pennsylvania Railroad

The Philadelphia, Wilmington, and Baltimore Railroad was completed from Wilmington to Baltimore in 1837 (save for the Susquehanna River ferry), with stops at most population centers including Elkton. A test train ran from Wilmington to Elkton on January 9, 1837, though service did not begin until July 31 of that year. A replacement station was built in 1855. The line became part of the Pennsylvania Railroad (PRR) in 1881.

The line originally ran on a tight curve through the town center, disrupting traffic and creating a collision hazard at grade crossings, as well as acting as a major speed restriction on express trains. In 1934, the PRR moved the line north of the downtown area to ease the curve and eliminate all grade crossings in Elkton. Construction on a new station began in February 1935 and was completed several months later. The new brick depot included baggage and waiting rooms, and a pedestrian passage under the tracks to the southbound platform. By 1938 Elkton was served by 18 trains per day.

Traffic declined after the construction of the Interstate Highway System; stopping service declined to three daily trains by 1963 and ended several years later. The line passed to Penn Central and eventually to Amtrak with all trains passing Elkton without stopping.

Amtrak

On April 30, 1978, Amtrak began operation of the Chesapeake, a once-daily commuter train between Philadelphia and Washington D.C., which included reopening several closed stations.

On January 1, 1983, the obligation for Conrail to provide commuter service on rail lines it had taken over in 1976 ended. SEPTA Regional Rail took over Philadelphia-area lines, while Amtrak began operating service in Maryland under contract to MARC. Now largely redundant to Amtrak intercity and MARC regional service, the Chesapeake was cut on October 30, 1983. SEPTA's Wilmington/Newark Line ran as far south as Newark, Delaware, while MARC service ran as far north as Perryville, Maryland. Elkton station, the only station in the gap between the two, was abandoned.

Proposed MARC service
Elkton is proposed to be revived as a station on an extension of MARC's Penn Line to Newark, Delaware.

References

External links

Former Amtrak stations in Maryland
Stations on the Northeast Corridor
Railway stations in the United States opened in 1978
Railway stations closed in 1983
Elkton, Maryland
Transportation buildings and structures in Cecil County, Maryland
Former Pennsylvania Railroad stations
Railway stations in the United States opened in 1837